Charles A. "Mickey" Finn (June 21, 1938 – April 24, 2007) was an American designer who specialized in designing and producing weapons systems for the U.S. military. He retired from defense work and began designing sporting equipment, including the Mickey Finn T-Bar Putter, a golf putter.

Background 
For thirty years Finn designed weapons systems for the U.S. military and other government agencies. In the industry he was referred to as "Q", after the special weapons supplier Q in James Bond fiction, and the name of Finn's original research company Qual-A-Tec.

After extensive research into black operations, author Tom Clancy used Finn's name to add an extra measure of realism to The Cardinal of the Kremlin. Finn retired from the defense industry after this public mention and started a business selling military and hunting knives.

Qual-A-Tec
Qual-A-Tec was a research and development firm originally based in Oceanside, California United States.  It later moved to Chino Valley, Arizona, United States. It was owned and operated by Finn and specialized in signature suppression and muzzle control devices for firearms. It also provided classified weapons systems to the U.S. government until it was forced to close when author Tom Clancy outed Finn and his company in the novel The Cardinal of the Kremlin.

The U.S. Army contract to design and build the M9 bayonet for the M16 rifle was awarded to Qual-A-Tec. Out of 49 companies that bid on the contract, theirs was the only one tested that had zero percent rate of failure. Finn and his M9 bayonet design were profiled in the October 30, 1986, issue of the LA Times and the January 5, 1987, issue of People magazine.

Quotation 
"Everything I design is the best, regardless of cost. In the weapons industry, if what you make has defects it costs lives. I couldn't live with that type of guilt."

Notes

External links 
  Mickey Finn biography from MickeyFinnGolf.com

1938 births
2007 deaths
20th-century American inventors